Suheir Hammad (born October 25, 1973) is an American poet, author, actress, performer, and political activist.

Biography
She was born in Amman, Jordan. Her parents were Palestinian refugees who immigrated along with their daughter to  Brooklyn, New York City when she was five years old. Her parents later moved to Staten Island.

As an adolescent growing up in Brooklyn, Hammad was heavily influenced by Brooklyn's vibrant hip-hop scene. She had also absorbed the stories from her parents and grandparents of life in their hometown of Lydda, before the 1948 Palestinian exodus, and of the suffering they endured afterward, first in the Gaza Strip and then in Jordan. From these disparate influences Hammad was able to weave into her work a common narrative of dispossession, not only in her capacity as an immigrant, a Palestinian and a Muslim, but as a woman struggling against society's inherent sexism and as a poet in her own right.

When hip-hop entrepreneur Russell Simmons came across her piece entitled "First Writing Since", a poem describing her reaction to the September 11 attacks, he signed her to a deal with HBO's Def Poetry Jam. She recited original works on tour for the following two years. In 2008, she was cast in her first fiction role in cinema, the Palestinian film Salt of this Sea (2008) by Annemarie Jacir, which premiered as an official selection in the Un Certain Regard competition of the Cannes Film Festival. She is now working on her third publication which will be a book of prose.
She took part in the Bush Theatre's 2011 project Sixty Six Books, for which she wrote a piece based upon the Book of Haggai in the King James Bible.

Film and video
 Lest We Forget (2003) – Narrator
 The Fourth World War (2004) – Narrator
 Salt of this Sea (2008) – Soraya
 When I Stretch Forth Mine Hand (2009) – Verses by
 Things Fall Apart (2010) - Guest Speaker
 Into Egypt (2011) – Writer and Performer

Produced plays
 breaking letter (s) (2008), New WORLD Theater
 Blood Trinity (2002), The New York Hip Hop Theater Festival
 ReOrientalism (2003)
 Libretto by Suheir Hammad

Awards
 The Audre Lorde Writing Award, Hunter College (1995, 2000)
 The Morris Center for Healing Poetry Award (1996)
 New York Mills Artist Residency (1998)
 Van Lier Fellowship (1999)
 The 2001 Emerging Artist Award, Asian/Pacific/American Studies Institute at NYU
 Tony Award – Special Theatrical Event – original cast member and writer for Russell Simmons Presents Def Poetry Jam on Broadway (2003)
 Suheir is also a talent associate for the Peabody Award-winning HBO show Russell Simmons Presents Def Poetry (2003)
 The 2009 American Book Awards

Works
 Born Palestinian, Born Black. Harlem River Press, 1996, .
 Drops of This Story Harlem River Press, 1996.
 Zaatar Diva Cypher Books, 2006, 
 Breaking Poems Cypher Books, 2008, 
 Born Palestinian, Born Black. UpSet Press, 2010,

Periodicals
 The Amsterdam News
 Black Renaissance/Renaissance Noire
 Brilliant Corners
 Clique
 Drum Voices Revue
 Essence
 Long Shot
 Atlanta Review
 Bomb
 Brooklyn Bridge
 Fierce
 STRESS Hip-Hop Magazine
 Quarterly Black Review of Books
 Color Lines
 Spheric
 The Olive Tree Review
 The Hunter Envoy
 Meridians
 Mizna
 Signs

Anthologies
 In Defense of Mumia (Writers and Readers)
 New to North America (Burning Bush Press)
 The Space Between Our Footsteps (Simon & Schuster)
 Identity lessons (Penguin)
 Listen Up! (Ballantine)
 Post Gibran: Anthology of New Arab-American Writing (Jusoor Press)
 Becoming American (Hyperion)
 Bum Rush the Page (Three Rivers Press)
 The Poetry of Arab Women (Interlink Books)
 Voices for Peace (Scribner)
 Another World is Possible (Subway & Elevated Press)
 33 Things Every Girl Should Know About Women’s History (Crown)
 Trauma at Home (Bison Press)
 Sing, Whisper, Shout, Pray!; Feminist Visions for a Just World (Edge Work)
 Russell Simmons Presents Def Poetry Jam on Broadway (Atria)
 Short Fuse, The Global Anthology of New Fusion Poetry, edited by Swift & Norton; (Rattapallax Press)
 Word. On Being a (Woman) Writer, edited by Jocelyn Burrell; (The Feminist Press)

References

Additional resources 
 Hanna, S. M. "Suheir Hammad's Negotiated Historiography of Arab America." Philology 61.1(2014): 44-71.
 Harb, Sirène. "Naming Oppressions, Representing Empowerment: June Jordan's and Suheir Hammad's Poetic Projects." Feminist Formations 26.3 (2014): 71-99.
 Hartman, Michelle. "‘A Debke Beat Funky as P.E.’s Riff’: Hip Hop Poetry and Politics in Suheir Hammad’s Born Palestinian, Born Black". Black Arts Quarterly 7.1 (2002): 6-8. Print.
 Harb, Sirène.  "Transformative Practices and Historical Revision: Suheir Hammad’s Born Palestinian, Born Black". Studies in the Humanities 35.1 (June 2008): 34-49.
 Hopkinson, Natalie. "Out of the Ashes, Drops of Meaning: The Poetic Success of Suheir Hammad". The Washington Post, 13 October 2002
 Oumlil, Kenza. "'Talking Back': The Poetry of Suheir Hammad". Feminist Media Studies 13.5 (2013): 850-859.

External links

 
 Suheir Hammad, text of "First Writing Since"
 Suheir Hammad Performing "First Writing Since"
 Suheir Hammad, text of "Mike Check"
 Suheir Hammad performing "Mike Check"
 "Into Egypt", short film
 Profile on Suheir Hammad at the Institute for Middle East Understanding
 Suheir Hammad performing two poems at the Palestine Festival of Literature
 
 eFilmCritic.com interview with Suheir Hammad about "Salt of This Sea" by Dan Lybarger
 
 "Poems of war, peace, women, power" (TEDWomen 2010)

1973 births
Living people
American Muslims
American poets
American writers of Palestinian descent
American women poets
American people of Jordanian descent
Proponents of Islamic feminism
People from Amman
People from Staten Island
Writers from Brooklyn
Jordanian feminists
American feminists
American Book Award winners
21st-century American poets
21st-century American women writers